is a Japanese photographer.

References
Nihon shashinka jiten / 328 Outstanding Japanese Photographers. Kyoto: Tankōsha, 2000. .  Despite the English-language alternative title, all in Japanese.

Japanese photographers
1960 births
Living people
Japanese women photographers
Place of birth missing (living people)
Date of birth missing (living people)